Ishwar Gupta Setu is a  long road bridge that crosses the Hooghly River in Bansberia, Hooghly and Kalyani, Nadia in West Bengal. Kalyani Expressway crosses the bridge connecting National Highway 12 with National Highway 19.

History 
The Ishwar Gupta Setu was named after famous poet Ishwar Chandra Gupta. This Bridge was commissioned in 1978 and was built during the time of 1981–1989 to reduce the traffic of Hooghly and Nadia district. On 6 October 1989, Jyoti Basu, former Chief Minister of West Bengal inaugurated the bridge in Kalyani. Due to the damage of existing bridge, a new Ishwar Gupta Setu is under construction by West Bengal Highway Development Corporation.

Gallery

References 

Bridges in West Bengal
Buildings and structures in Hooghly district
Bridges completed in 1989
20th-century architecture in India